The 2021 season for  was the 47th season in the team's existence, the sixth as a UCI ProTeam, and the first under the current name. Japanese construction company Nippo Corporation, which had been a co-title sponsor last season, left the team to sponsor UCI WorldTeam  instead.

On 11 October, the team ceased operations with immediate effect due to financial difficulties.

Team roster 

Riders who joined the team for the 2021 season

Riders who left the team during or after the 2020 season

Season victories

National, Continental, and World Champions

Notes

References

External links 
 

2021 road cycling season by team
2021 in French sport